Nebraska College of Technical Agriculture (UNL–NCTA) is a public technical college in Curtis, Nebraska. It is part of the University of Nebraska system.

History
The Nebraska Legislature passed a bill to establish a Nebraska School of Agriculture as a boarding school for high school students in 1911. Curtis was selected as the site for the new school, over 11 other applicants in the state. Classes began in 1913.

In the 1960s, the Nebraska Legislature passed legislation to convert the school to a post-secondary agriculture school, the University of Nebraska School of Technical Agriculture (UNSTA). The college opened in 1965.

UNSTA was adopted by the University of Nebraska system as the Nebraska College of Technical Agriculture in Curtis in 1994.

Academics
Students at the college may seek A.A.S. degree, A.S. degrees, or certificates in agribusiness management, agriculture production systems or veterinary technology.

Campus 
NCTA and its earlier institutions have continually operated with business offices and the administration located in the first building on campus, Agriculture Hall at 404 East 7th Street, Curtis.

References

External links 
Official website

Nebraska College of Technical Agriculture
Educational institutions established in 1965
Education in Frontier County, Nebraska
Buildings and structures in Frontier County, Nebraska
USCAA member institutions
1965 establishments in Nebraska